The Towneley or Townley family are an English (UK) family whose ancestry can be traced back to Anglo-Saxon England.  Towneley Hall in Burnley, Lancashire, was the family seat until its sale, together with the surrounding park, to the corporation of Burnley in 1901. Towneley Hall is now a Grade I listed building and a large museum and art gallery within Towneley Park (UK).

Early members of the branch of the family at Towneley Hall served as soldiers, some holding positions such as High Sheriff of Lancashire. However, they generally retained the Catholic faith meaning that from the mid-16th century they were fined and imprisoned for recusancy and banned from public office until the Roman Catholic Relief Act of 1829.

Other branches of the family were based at Hurstwood near Towneley, Royle on the opposite side of Burnley and later Littleton in Surrey, Dutton close to Ribchester, Barnside near Colne, and Carr Hall and Stonedge near Barrowford.

The Towneleys of Towneley Hall
Sometime between 1195 and 1211, Roger de Lacy made a grant of lands at 'Tunleia', 'Coldcotes' and 'Snodesworth' (Snodworth is south of Langho) to Geoffrey, son of Robert the Dean of Whalley. By 1295 Nicholas de Towneley, thought to be a descendant of Geoffrey, had died and Towneley was shared between his three sisters Agnes, Cecily and Isabel. Cecily was married to John de la Legh, the son of Gilbert, the manager of the local de Lacy cattle farms. The de la Legh family were the largest tenant in Cliviger at the time that it was a possession of Kirkstall Abbey, renting about 40% of the township. And Gilbert had purchased the manor of Hapton in 1303–04, only to have this blocked by Henry de Lacy, and he was forced to wait until 1328 to acquire it. The same year he also purchased Isabel's third of Towneley from her family, the Claytons. John and Cecily had two sons, Gilbert and Richard. While Gilbert would take control at Hapton and also purchase the neighbouring manor of Birtwistle in 1356, Richard would take Towneley.

Richard de Towneley (c.1313–1381)

Richard de Towneley, also known as Richard de la Legh, was born circa 1323. By 1345 he had married Ellen. In 1351, at the time of the plague known as the Black Death, Richard rented the manor of St Saviour (Stydd) near Ribchester, probably living there for the rest of his life. The same year, along with his brother Gilbert, the Abbot of Whalley and John de Altham, he held the franchise for providing a bailiff for Blackburnshire. In 1353 he was one of two receivers for Lancashire appointed by the 1st Duke of Lancaster, also attending the Parliaments of 1361 and 1371 as a knight of Lancashire. He was Escheator of the County in 1371 and served as the High Sheriff of Lancashire from 1374 to 1377. He died on 16 April 1381, survived by three sons, John, Robert and Henry.

John Towneley (1350–1399)
Married Isabella de Rishton, probably in 1382. John's uncle Gilbert died without heir, so in addition to two-thirds of Towneley, plus land in Cliviger, in Worsthone, and in Briercliffe, he inherited Hapton and Birtwistle. By 1388 he had acquired the remaining third of Towneley from the descendants of Agnes.

Richard Towneley (1387–1455)
Married Alice. Man-at-arms at the battle of Agincourt.

John Towneley (1415–c. 1473)
Married three times, however only had children with his second wife Isabela Sherburne.

Sir Richard Towneley (1445–1482)
Son of John and Isabel. Married Joanna Southworth in 1472. Knighted at Hutton Field in 1482, during Richard Duke of Gloucester's (later King Richard III) Scottish Campaign that captured Berwick-upon-Tweed. Died in 1482 of wounds suffered during the capture of Berwick Castle.

Sir John Towneley (1473–1540)
Son of Sir Richard and Joanna. Married to Isabel Pilkington in 1480, his father died when John was only nine and he reached adulthood under the guardianship of her father Sir Charles Pilkington. His wife Isabel inherited Gateford in Nottinghamshire in 1485. He was knighted on 30 September 1497 by the Earl of Surrey, probably at Ayton when the peace treaty was signed with Scotland after the Perkin Warbeck skirmishes. He established Hapton Park, in 1514 and enlarged it to cover 1100 Lancashire acres (equivalent to ), which amounted to about half of Hapton township, making it the second largest in Lancashire after Knowsley. Was High Sheriff of Lancashire in 1532.

Richard Towneley (1499–1555)
Son of Sir John and Isabel, married Grace (also known as Elizabeth) Foljambe in 1511. His son with Grace, also called Richard married Francis Wimbishe around 1536. Francis was the sister of Thomas Wymbishe and inherited his Nocton estate in Lincolnshire on his death in 1553. Knighted in 1547, possibly at the Battle of Pinkie Cleugh. Only one daughter, Mary, survived to adulthood.

John Towneley (c. 1528–1607)

Son of Sir John's second son Charles and Elizabeth Kaye. Half-brother through his mother to Alexander Nowell, and Lawrence Nowell (amongst others). Often known as John Towneley of Gray's Inn because he was a Lawyer. Acquired Towneley by his marriage in 1557 to then 16-year-old Mary, his first cousin once removed, he being a grandchild and she a great-grandchild of Sir John. Fined and imprisoned several times between 1573 and 1594 for recusancy and giving shelter to Catholic priests during the reign of Elizabeth I.

Richard Towneley (1566–1628)
Born at Towneley Hall, Burnley. Son of John and Mary. Married Jane Ashton in 1594. Built a large extension on the north side of the hall that was finished about 1626.

Richard Towneley (1598–1635)
Son of Richard and Jane. Died unmarried.

Charles Towneley (1600–1644)
Born at Towneley Hall. Son of Richard and Jane. Catholic. Attended St. Omer's College and Louvain in Belgium and the English College in Rome between 1614 and 1624. Married Mary Trappes in 1628. Inherited the estate in 1635 upon the death of his brother Richard. Killed leading a small Infantry regiment for the Royalists at the Battle of Marston Moor during the English Civil War.

Richard Towneley (1629–1707)

Recovered the Lancashire estates from the Parliamentary Sequestration Committee. The first person to make regular measurements of rainfall in England. Inventor of the Deadbeat escapement.

Charles Towneley (1658–1712)
Son of Richard and Margaret. Married Ursula Fermor in 1685. Implicated with his father in the plot to secure the return to the English throne of King James II in 1690 that resulted in the Battle of the Boyne.

Richard Towneley (1689–1735)
Son of Charles and Ursula. Married Mary Widdrington, the sister of William Widdrington, 4th Baron Widdrington in 1713. Arrested for treason in 1715, after the Battle of Preston, he was later acquitted after an expensive trial. He died on 18 August 1735. Two of his brothers, John and Francis joined the French army before aiding the Jacobite rising of 1745. Francis Towneley was the Colonel that raised the Manchester Regiment, later being captured after the Siege of Carlisle (December 1745) and executed in 1746. The children's book How The Hangman Lost His Heart, although a work of fiction, is inspired by his story. John returned to France before Culloden and was made a Chevalier (Knight) of the Order of Saint Louis. Another brother, George avoided the conflict, instead marrying Mary Hodgson, the heiress of Leighton Hall near Carnforth.

William Towneley (1714–1742)
The Son of Richard and Mary, he was born at Towneley on 30 May 1714. He Married Cecilia Standish, granddaughter of the 6th Duke of Norfolk in 1736. He died at Bath, Somerset on 2 February 1742. After his death at the age of 27, his widow left Towneley Hall at the time of Jacobite rising and did not return.

Charles Townley (1737–1805)

Son of William and Cecilia. Collector of the Towneley Marbles (including the Townley Venus, Townley Vase and Townley Discobolus). After his death Towneley passed to his brother Edward Standish, however when he died in 1807 it passed back to their uncle John.

John Towneley (1731–1813)
Son of Richard and Mary. Book collector. Married Barbara Dicconson in 1756. His collection included the Towneley Cycle. In 1786, his uncle George left him the Leighton estate, which he had greatly improved. In 1792 he inherited the Widdrington's Stella estates through his mother. Trustee of British Museum. Elected as a fellow of the Royal Society of London in 1797. Sold the Leighton estate in 1805.

Peregrine Edward Towneley (1762–1846)
Born on 10 October 1762 at Corney House, Chiswick. Son of John and Barbara. Married Charlotte Drummond in 1794. Elected as a fellow of the Royal Society of London in 1812. In 1814 he sold his father's book collection to fund improvements to the Hall, for which he employed the services of the architect Jeffry Wyattville. Around 1817, he donated land and £1000 to build the town's first catholic chapel since the catholic emancipation. The site was on the Todmorden Road in the Burnley Wood area of Habergham Eaves which was later incorporated into the township of Burnley close to the present day St. Mary's Church. Following the Roman Catholic Relief Act 1829, he became High Sheriff of Lancashire in 1831. Purchased the Lordship of Bowland in 1835. His daughter Frances went on to marry Thomas Stonor (later made the 3rd Baron Camoys), one their children was the Catholic archbishop Edmund Stonor.

Colonel Charles Towneley (1803–1876)

Son of Peregrine and Charlotte. He married Lady Caroline Molyneux, the daughter of William Molyneux, 2nd Earl of Sefton in 1836 and had three daughters: Alice, the second wife of Thomas O'Hagan, 1st Baron O'Hagan, Emily, who married Lord Alexander Gordon-Lennox, and Caroline, who married Montagu Bertie, 7th Earl of Abingdon. Elected as a fellow of the Royal Society of London in 1842. Held the Lordship of Bowland from 1846 to 1876. Elected as an MP for Sligo Borough (now in the Republic of Ireland) in 1848 and 1852, however, unseated on petition both times. High Sheriff of Lancashire in 1857. His horse Kettledrum won the 1861 Epsom Derby, He (and possibly others) used the winnings to build St Hubert's catholic church in Dunsop Bridge. Towneley was commissioned on 16 March 1853 to raise the 5th Royal Lancashire Militia with the rank of Lieutenant-Colonel Commandant, with his brother John as one of the majors. He retired from the command on 23 March 1863 (when his brother was promoted to succeed him) and was appointed Honorary Colonel of the regiment. JP. DL. FSA.

John Towneley (1806–1878)

Son of Peregrine and Charlotte, brother of Charles, married Lucy Tichborne, the daughter of Henry Joseph Tichborne, (the 8th Baronet) and Anne, daughter of Sir Thomas Burke, Marble Hill, Galway Ireland in 1840. Was MP for Beverly from 1841 to 1852. He followed his brother as Lt-Col (1863) and then Hon Col (1876) of the 5th Royal Lancashire Militia. Held the Lordship of Bowland from 1876 to 1878. Inherited the estate two years before he died, and his only son, Richard, died the year before. John had four daughters, Therese who married John Delacour, Evelyn, Mary, and Mabel. It was necessary to divide the estate between Charles' and John's daughters. Charles' eldest daughter Caroline was already dead and her share went to her husband Montagu Bertie, 7th Earl of Abingdon. His middle daughter Emily, the wife of Lord Alexander Gordon-Lennox inherited the properties in Worsthorne and Cliviger. The portion that included Towneley Hall and its park went to his youngest, Alice, the wife of Baron O'Hagan.

Lady Alice O'Hagan (1846–1921)
Alice found it difficult to maintain Towneley Hall. In 1901, she sold the Hall and 62 acres of parkland to the Burnley Corporation.

Alice married  Thomas O'Hagan, 1st Baron O'Hagan KP (29 May 1812 – 1 February 1885). Born in Belfast, the son of a trader. He was called to the Irish Bar in 1836. Between 1838 and 1841 he was the editor of the Newry Examiner. In 1840 he moved to Dublin, becoming an Irish Queen's Counsel in 1849.

His appointment as Solicitor-General for Ireland in 1860 and Attorney-General in the following year, lost him the support of the Nationalist party, but he was returned to Parliament as Liberal Member of Parliament (MP) for Tralee in 1863. In 1865 he was appointed a judge of common pleas, and in 1868 became Lord Chancellor of Ireland, the first Roman Catholic to hold the chancellorship since the reign of James II.

In 1870 he was created  Baron O'Hagan, of Tullahogue in the County of Tyrone, and held office until the resignation of the ministry in 1874. In 1880 he again became Lord Chancellor on Gladstone's return to office, but resigned in 1881, when he became Vice Chancellor of the Royal University of Ireland.

Thomas Towneley O'Hagan, 2nd Baron O'Hagan (5 December 1878 – 13 December 1900). From 1899, he served in South Africa during the Boer War as a lieutenant in the 3rd Battalion of Grenadier Guards, but died abruptly of an unknown illness (thought to have been malaria) just over a week after his 22nd birthday.

Maurice Towneley-O'Hagan, 3rd Baron O'Hagan (20 February 1882 – 18 December 1961). The second son of Thomas O'Hagan, 1st Baron O'Hagan. He succeeded in the barony on the death of his elder brother in 1900, when he was still eighteen.

He served as a government whip in the House of Lords, from 1907 to 1910 in the Liberal Government. In 1909, he assumed by Royal licence his maternal grandfather's surname of Towneley in addition to that of O'Hagan.

During World War I he was a Major in the Essex Royal Horse Artillery, for which he raised a regiment in 1914. He was invalided out of the army in 1918.

He switched to supporting the Conservatives in the mid-1920s. Between 1950 and 1961, O'Hagan was a Deputy Speaker and Deputy Chairman of the House of Lords.

Lord O'Hagan married firstly the Hon. Frances Constance Maddalena, daughter of Edward Strachey, 1st Baron Strachie, in 1911. She died in 1931. He married secondly Evelyn Violet, daughter of Harry Thornton Ross, in 1937. O'Hagan died in December 1961, his son the Hon. Thomas Anthony Edward Towneley Strachey having predeceased him in 1955, he was succeeded in the barony by his grandson Charles.

Charles Towneley Strachey, 4th Baron O'Hagan (born 6 September 1945). He served as a Page to Elizabeth II between 1957 and 1961 when he inherited the family title. He first took his seat in the House of Lords on 5 December 1967. A relative of the Strachey Baronets, he is the great-great-grandson of Edward Strachey, 1st Baron Strachie.

He was an Independent MEP for Devon from 1972–1975. In the first direct elections to the European Parliament in 1979, he was returned for Devon as a Conservative, and remained an MEP until his retirement when his constituency was abolished in 1994. During his time as an MEP he also served as a whip and a frontbench spokesman for the Conservative government in the House of Lords.

In 2008, after years of ill health, he offered to sell some of his subsidiary titles to pay for medical bills.  In 2009, it was reported that Lord O'Hagan had claimed the Lordship of Bowland. Previously thought lost or in the possession of the Crown having disappeared from the historical record in the late nineteenth century, it transpired that the title had been retained by an extinct family trust.

Lord O'Hagan has been married three times – firstly to Princess Tamara Imeretinsky (1967–84), secondly to Mary Roose-Francis (1985–95), and thirdly to Elizabeth Smith (1995–present). He has two daughters—one from each of his first two marriages (Nina, born 1968; and Antonia, born 1986)—and his heir apparent is his younger brother the Hon. Richard Towneley Strachey.

Sir Simon Peter Edmund Cosmo William Towneley (1921–2022)

Great-grandson of Caroline Towneley through his mother's (Priscilla Reyntiens) mother (Lady Alice Josephine Bertie), and brother of Peregrine Worsthorne. Assumed the surname and arms of Towneley by Royal Licence. High Sheriff of Lancashire in 1971. Lord Lieutenant of Lancashire from 1976 to 1996. Made a KCVO in 1994. His late wife Mary was a keen horse rider and instrumental in the development of the Pennine Bridleway, as a result, the part of the route is named after her. She was made an MBE in the Queen's Birthday Honours in 2000. One of their daughters is the author K M Grant.

Other Branches of the Family

Townley of Dutton

Dutton Hall is close to Ribchester in Lancashire.

Possibly descended from Robert Towneley, the 2nd son of Richard de Towneley and Ellen. However, the evidence also suggests a later source for this branch of the family.

Richard Townley (died around 1670) is believed to have built Dutton Hall.

Richard Townley (1689–1762) married Jane Greaves. Steward to Alexander Butterworth of Belfield Hall in Rochdale (formerly in Lancashire now in Greater Manchester). Inherited the Belfield Estate in 1728. Also Inherited the Greaves family's Fulbourn Estate in Cambridgeshire and Beaupré Hall in Norfolk. High Sheriff of Lancashire in 1751.

Colonel Richard Townley (1726–1801), eldest son of Richard and Jane. Married Anne Western in 1750. Patron and friend of the author John Collier AKA Tim Bobbin.

Richard Greaves Townley (1751–1823), eldest son of Richard and Anne. Married Margaret Gale in 1785. His daughter Margaret married Charles Mitford, their son was the politician William Townley Mitford.

Richard Greaves Townley (1786–1855), eldest son of Richard and Margaret. Married Cecil Watson in 1821. Was MP for Cambridgeshire from 1831 to 1841 and from 1847 to 1852. He sold the Belfield Estate in 1851. One of his sons was the Jockey and Cricketer, Captain Thomas Manners Townley (1825–1895), who came second in the 1860 Grand National.

Charles Watson Townley (1824–1893), second son of Richard and Cecil. Married Georgiana Dallison in 1874. Was Lord Lieutenant of Cambridgeshire 1874 from 1893. One of his sons was Sir Walter Townley  (1863–1945) who married Lady Susan Keppel in 1896, the daughter of William Keppel, 7th Earl of Albemarle. He entered a career in the diplomatic service. He held Ambassadorial positions to Romania 1911–12, Iran 1912–1916 and the Netherlands 1917–1919. Another son was the agriculturist and politician Max Townley.

Rev. Charles Francis Townley (1856–1930), eldest son of Carles and Georgiana. Married Alice Rosalinde Murray Pratt in 1885.

Charles Evelyn Townley (1887–1983), eldest son of Charles and Alice. Married Marjorie Templer.

Richard Templer Townley (1921–present), eldest son of Charles and Marjorie.

Towneley of Barnside
Barnside is east of Colne in Lancashire. This branch of the family also owned Carr Hall (demolished in the 1950s) on the southwestern edge of Barrowford.

Believed to be descended from Lawrence Towneley (1447-1530), the 2nd son of John Towneley and Isabel Sherburne. Brother of Sir Richard.

Henry Towneley (c. 1541–?) married Anne Catterall (c. 1539–?), daughter of Thomas Catherall in 1559. It has been suggested that this is the Anne Towneley whose death is mentioned in the Pendle witch trials.

Lawrence Towneley donated a font to the Anglican St Bartholomew's Church in Colne in 1590.

Townley of Royle and Littleton
Royle is on the northern edge of Burnley on the River Calder, Lancashire.

Littleton refers to Astlam (Astleham) Manor (formerly in Middlesex, today in Surrey), now submerged beneath the Queen Mary Reservoir next to the site of Shepperton Studios.

Believed to be descended from Nicholas Towneley (born after 1446), the 3rd son of John Towneley and Isabel Sherburne. Brother of Sir Richard.

Richard Towneley (1482–1541), married Margaret Clarke.

Nicholas Towneley (1505–1546), eldest son of Richard and Margaret. Entered Gray's Inn in 1522. Married Anne Vaughan.

Edmund Townley (c. 1532–1598), eldest son of Nicholas and Margaret. Married Katherine Curzon.

Nicholas Towneley (c. 1574–1645), eldest son of Edmund and Katherine. Married Isabell Woodroffe. Was High Sheriff of Lancashire in 1631.

Francis Townley (c. 1576–1636), son of Edmund and Katherine. Married Catherine Foster. Inherited land in Littleton through his mother around 1600.

Nicholas Townley (1612–1687), eldest son of Francis and Catherine. Entered Gray's Inn in 1623. Married Joanne White. He was known as Nicholas Townley of Littleton. Unsuccessfully attempted to regain the Royle estate in the Court of Chancery in 1646. Sold Astlam around 1660 and moved into London. One of his sons Richard went to America in 1683. He married his 2nd wife, Elizabeth Carteret (née. Smith), widow of the 1st governor of New Jersey Sir Philip Carteret in 1685. Their descendants include Jonathan Townley Crane, Stephen Crane and A. C. Townley.

Nicholas Townley (1642–1685), married Jane Gildredge. He was known as Nicholas Townley of East Bourne.

Charles Townley and James Townley are believed to be the great-grandsons of Nicholas and Joanne, through their father's father (both also called Charles).

Townley of Hurstwood

Hurstwood is 2 miles from Towneley Hall.

This branch was started by Bernard Towneley (c1532-1602), illegitimate son of John Towneley, the brother of Sir John. He married Agnes Ormeroyd. He built Hurstwood Hall in 1579.

John Towneley (c. 1560–?) married Eleanor Haydock in 1583.

John Townley (1584–?) married Eleanor Grymshaw.

John Towneley (1631–1664) married Katherine Rishton.

John Towneley (c. 1651–1704)

Towneley of Stone Edge
Stone Edge is near Barrowford.

The Stone Edge (or Stonehedge) branch of the family was established by a Lawrence Towneley (1543-1598), the great-grandson of the Lawrence Townley (1447-1530) which established the Barnside branch (above). The Barnside branch is junior only to the main branch, and the Stone Edge branch is junior only to those two branches.

Descendants include: Elizabeth II, George Washington and Robert E. Lee.

References

Sources
 
 
 
 H.G. Hart, The New Annual Army List, and Militia List (various dates from 1840)

External links
 A genealogical and heraldic history of the commoners of Great Britain and Ireland enjoying territorial possessions or high official rank vol 2 at Internet Archive

English families
History of Lancashire
People from Burnley
English gentry families